Lee Sang-jo (1915–1996) was a politician and soldier from the Democratic People's Republic of Korea (North Korea). He was also known under the name Taek-Myung Kim (金澤明).

Biography
Born in Dongnae District, South Gyeongsang Province, he acted with Choi Chang-ik at the Chinese Communist Party, and in 1941 went to Yan'an, the home of the Chinese Communist Party, and joined the Mao Zedong family. After entering Korea in 1945 following its liberation as a result of the surrender of Japan, he joined the communist armed forces. When the Korean War broke out, as the rank of Lieutenant General of the Korean People's Army, he served as the reconnaissance chief and vice chief of staff. At this time, it is said that Paik Sun-yup, who was the representative of the South Korean military, said "an unmade dog", and maintained a nasty expression even if flies sat on his face for more than an hour to show dignity. On 17 April 1953 he signed on behalf of North Korea the Agreement of Exchanging Sick and Wounded Prisoners of War at the North Korea Peace Museum in Panmunjom.

Afterward, Kim Il-sung's position was narrowed in the military dominated by the partisan faction, and he became a diplomat in 1955. Together, they sent a letter to the Soviet Union and China, informing them of the dictatorship of Kim Il-sung and exerting pressure on North Korea. Accordingly, Kim Il-Sung canceled the schedule and returned quickly, countering the August party convention (August Faction Incident that Choe Chang-ik tried to defeat Kim Il-Sung, and eventually broke the Soviet-Korean faction and the Yan'an faction. In September 1989, he visited South Korea and testified that Kim Il-sung led the invasion at the time of the Korean War under Stalin's approval.

References

External links

North Korean atheists
North Korean communists
1915 births
1996 deaths
North Korean military personnel of the Korean War
North Korean military personnel
People granted political asylum in the Soviet Union